Believe is an American fantasy drama television series that was broadcast as part of the 2013–14 United States network television schedule on NBC as a mid-season entry. Originally 13 episodes were to be aired, but only 12 were aired in the U.S. The series was created by Academy Award winner Alfonso Cuarón and Mark Friedman. The series began on March 10, 2014, and was canceled on May 9, 2014. The final episode aired on June 15, 2014.

Plot
Bo is a young girl who was born with special supernatural abilities that she could not control. As these powers started evolving, the people who were protecting her were forced to turn to an outsider for help. This led them to William Tate, a wrongfully convicted death-row inmate, whom they break out of prison. Although he is reluctant to take on the role as her protector, the two eventually form a bond that guide them to helping each other, as well as others, while staying one step ahead of the evil forces that want the girl.

Cast and characters

Main
 Jake McLaughlin as William Tate, Jr. – Originally a death row inmate in a national security prison, Tate is weathered and jaded from seven years of imprisonment and the painful loss of his soul mate Nina Adams (not knowing Skouras forced her to end their relationship). Tate has recurring anger problems, leading to a long history of violence and brushes with the law. Minutes before his execution for two counts of felony murder (of which he claims he is innocent, something no one ever believed, having been framed by his friends during a robbery), Winter (disguised as a priest) visits him and offers a chance at freedom if he agrees to protect Bo. Tate reluctantly agrees to accept Winter's assistance, and later his employment offer as Bo's protector. Originally he is unaware that he is actually Bo's father (a fact known by Winter's team, the Orchestra Project and the FBI), but Winter is later encouraged by Bo to tell him – while the news sounds unbelievable, he senses he somehow knew all along. Afterwards, he becomes a more kind and supportive parent figure.
 Johnny Sequoyah as Bo Adams – An extraordinarily gifted girl with the power to change the world. She was one of Winter's most promising subjects, born and raised at Orchestra and displaying extraordinary psychic and telekinetic powers inherited from her mother, Nina. To the government, Bo's existence is highly classified government property and is officially a national defense priority. Bo herself is regarded as a federal asset and ward of the U.S. government, with no family. Winter is the only person Bo knows she can trust, and also she considers his team the closest thing to a family she has, but she steadily develops a bond with Tate after he repeatedly risks his life and freedom for her. Originally, she was unaware that Tate is her father, although later correctly guesses, and accepts, the truth.
 Jamie Chung as Janice Channing – Winter's second in command and an Orchestra fugitive. Dedicated, tough and strong-willed, Channing is devoted to protecting Bo. She frequently clashes with Tate, openly doubting his loyalty and feels the arrangement for him to act as Bo's protector is never going to work – Channing sees herself as a mother figure to Bo, and believes she would be better at protecting the child, although later accepts Tate as a worthy parent figure. According to her background, she is a combat-trained fighter who was Orchestra's head of security – she worked at the Orchestra Campus for Skouras for several years, hired to effectively keep Bo captive. Later she deployed as an operative to recover Bo, although she instead turned Channing against Skouras after she had healed the injuries Channing sustained trying to capture her.
 Kyle MacLachlan as Dr. Roman Skouras – A world-famous geneticist and head of Orchestra - a government sanctioned program and top secret classified operation designed to weaponize individuals with psychic abilities, funding it through his corporation Skouras Worldwide. Skouras is Winter's old partner, now mortal enemy. He is admired by many people for his work, and is a publicly awarded humanitarian, although others know he only cares about his own ideas and doing anything to achieve them. Skouras is a very powerful man working in cooperation with high-level elements of the U.S. government to locate Tate and recover Bo unharmed. He subsequently employs assassins, hires mercenaries and uses every resource at his command to recover the gifted prodigy and return her home to Orchestra. He claims he is only acting to protect Bo and offer proper guidance as a gifted telekinetic and psychic, but in truth he wants to market Bo's abilities as a weapon to the military. His nefarious schemes cost him his partnership with Winter who, with his team, broke ranks and fled with Bo, as Skouras's goals would endanger her. Skouras's erratic behavior and questionable experimentation methods (which are caused in no small part by pressure from the military, who are putting him under increasing pressure to deliver a telepathic weapon as he had originally promised) leads his other researchers to doubt his intentions, but also to improvements in his other telepathic subjects, which he uses to further his objectives for Bo. According to his background, his parents are named Evelyn and Ronald, and he was born in Oak Park, Illinois on December 1, 1954. According to Winter, Skouras's darkest secret is he has established another program, a top secret black ops plan for other telepaths; he plans to use his weaponized telepaths to build his own psychic army.
 Delroy Lindo as Dr. Milton Winter – A cunning and brilliant scientist and the leader of a shadow organization responsible for protecting individuals with rare and incredible powers. He is Skouras's old partner, now mortal enemy. He is dedicated to protecting Bo from Skouras and the army of henchmen he employs. Originally, Winter and his team used to work at Project Orchestra beside Skouras, and Winter raised Bo in the facility from infancy. At some point in the process, Winter and his entire team defected from Orchestra, took Bo, and went on the run. Winter also faked his death, working from that point to protect Bo. According to his background, he worked at DARPA and MIT, and was a CIA field agent psychologist – Skouras describes Winter as "the global authority on the conscious and unconscious mind".

Recurring
Juri Henley-Cohn as Luke Hayden – One of Winter's team and an Orchestra fugitive. Hayden later becomes disillusioned with the mission to protect Bo after the deaths of four of the ten team members, and ultimately feels he could not make the necessary sacrifices. He abandons the team, and is arrested by the FBI shortly after. Ferrell turns Hayden to apparently give up Winter's command center in New York, only for Ferrell's team to find it deserted.
Richard Hollis as Robert Gilman – One of Winter's team and an Orchestra fugitive.
Katie McClellan as Lilah Leeds – One of Winter's team and an Orchestra fugitive. She is a technology specialist, and was on the team that developed Orchestra's prototype telepathic tracking computer.
Kerry Condon as Dr. Zoe Boyle – Orchestra's head of research and Winter's replacement, Zoe is Skouras's head researcher and loyal confidant at Orchestra, who runs the research program following Winter's departure – working to continue experiments with the other talented telepaths at the facility. Zoe helped Winter raise Bo, and cares about her very deeply. After Winter's departure, Zoe wants Bo returned home to Orchestra (primarily due to the possibility that Bo's health could degrade due to her abilities), seeing her as one of a kind and vulnerable in the outside world. Nevertheless, Bo remains the common ground that allows Winter and Zoe to trust each other - she is aware that Winter took Bo as the military would use her as a weapon, and also isn't comfortable with Skouras's excessive experimentation methods. In no position to challenge his authority, Zoe secretly acts as Winter's mole inside the Orchestra Campus, until she is exposed to Skouras by Dani, another test subject. Skouras has Dani mentally erase all of Zoe's memories of Bo and Orchestra.
Arian Moayed as Corey – A technology specialist working at Orchestra. He is completely loyal to Skouras.
Erik LaRay Harvey as Marcus Krakauer – A mercenary on loan from the CIA, and a tracker not on the FBI's radar, who is rumored to be psychotic. He is hired by Skouras as an operative to track down Bo and Tate.
Nick Tarabay as Niko Zepeda – Skouras's henchman working at Orchestra.
Peter McRobbie as FBI Director Lofton – The Director of the FBI and Ferrell's superior. He is one of the government administration members working with Skouras and Orchestra. He acts as a liaison with Skouras to the government, while also giving Ferrell permission to use federal orders and other ample resources for the investigation to locate and recover Bo. Later, Ferrell informs Lofton she has quit the Tate case but will still remain with the FBI.
Trieste Kelly Dunn as FBI Special Agent Elizabeth Ferrell – The FBI agent in charge of full-fledged manhunt launched to recapture escaped death row inmate William Tate, Ferrell is solicited by the Director of the FBI to help and work with Skouras and Orchestra to track down Tate and Bo. Skouras emphasizes repeatedly that Bo is his top priority, assuring her that Bo's safety is his main concern, but she can tell he's not being entirely honest with her. Ferrell issues a nationwide AMBER Alert, broadcasting photos of Bo and Tate on every news channel over Skouras's repeated objections. Originally adopting traditional FBI methods to apprehend Tate, whom she sees as a very dangerous fugitive, and "rescue" Bo, whom she sees as an endangered minor, Ferrell steadily begins to understand what Bo is capable of, and also begins realizing there is more behind the manhunt than originally assumed. According to her background, she has a young daughter named Sasha. After Tate and Bo save Ferrell and her daughter from a subway bombing, Ferrell finally accepts Tate's innocence and abandons her pursuit.
Matthew Rauch as FBI Agent Martin – One of Ferrell's two best agents.
Ato Essandoh as FBI Agent Garner – One of Ferrell's two best agents.
Rob Morgan as Joshua Carpenter – An Orchestra test subject, Joshua was a promising telepath capable of matter manipulation, who has been with Orchestra almost three years, and was one of Skouras's most talented subjects. His experimentation had left him fully weaponized as an active telepathic assassin. Skouras sent his new weapon on a field assignment – to track down Bo and locate and neutralize Orchestra's unknown insider leak (Zoe Boyle). During the confrontation, however, Bo attacked and left him incapacitated as he is mentally erasing a blogger's mind. Left in a coma with no possibility to recover, Skouras encouraged Shawn, his friend and fellow test subject, to "help" Joshua by putting him out of his misery, as well as showing his own strength. Shawn reluctantly kills his friend at Skouras' request.
Owen Campbell as Shawn – An Orchestra test subject, Shawn is a promising telepath, not as powerful as Bo. He has suffered severe behavioral and emotional problems due to his ability, although Orchestra has worked hard to harness his gifts. Skouras orders Shawn's rapid development to satisfy Orchestra's military superiors, over Zoe's objections that Shawn's control over his abilities was fragile, and the risk of instability was too great. Skouras encourages Shawn to accept and embrace his gifts, and manipulates him into becoming an active telepathic assassin. Shawn reluctantly kills Joshua, his friend and fellow test subject now comatose, with his powers to show his strength.
Mia Vallet as Dani – An extremely powerful telepath who was inadvertently discovered by Orchestra (when her powers are detected by Skouras's telepathic tracking computer), Dani is the most powerful telepath Orchestra has come across since Bo, but she is untrusting and fiercely independent when she quickly realizes the extent of her power. Skouras meets with Dani and eventually convinces her to be taken to Orchestra, and accepts Skouras' training to make her abilities stronger. Skouras sees Dani as his next masterpiece – intending to turn her into his new weapon. Dani discovers Zoe is the Orchestra mole, and threatens to out her to Skouras if she interferes with Skouras' plan. According to her background, she is a homeless runaway with no family or friends, previously involved in foster care and group homes. Her earliest memory of having an ability was when she was five, while at school, she started telekinetically moving pencils, but her parents thought she was lying. When she was twelve, they became afraid of their daughter when they thought Dani killed her brother in an angry rage over her stolen diary.

Episodes

Development and production
The series first appeared as part of NBC's development slate in September 2012. In January 2013, NBC green-lit production of a pilot episode. On May 12, 2013, the series was placed on the network's 2013–14 schedule, where it was expected to debut after the 2014 Winter Olympics.

On July 17, 2013, co-creator and executive producer Mark Friedman departed the series. Cuarón stayed on board as executive producer alongside J.J. Abrams. Friedman was ultimately succeeded by Dave Erickson. A few months later, in December, Erickson also stepped down as executive producer/showrunner and was replaced by Jonas Pate, who was serving as a co-executive producer and series director. Pate ran the day-to-day production of the series along with Hans Tobeason, who served as "on-set" producer in New York, where filming took place. To allow a smoother transition for the new showrunners and accommodate script re-writes, production went on hiatus from December 20 to January 6, 2014.

Every scene in the pilot episode is a long take (One of Cuaron's trademarks), but that format was dropped beginning with the second episode.

Casting
McLaughlin (Tate) was the first regular to be cast in February 2013, followed by Lindo (Winter),<ref>"Delroy Lindo to Co-Star in NBC's J.J. Abrams-Alfonso Cuaron Drama 'Believe' (Exclusive)", Hollywood Reporter, 26 February 2013.</ref> Sienna Guillory, Chung (Channing) and ten-year-old newcomer Sequoyah (Bo). MacLachlan was added in March 2013 as was Arian Moayed. In June 2013, Guillory was dropped from the series after the pilot, with producers choosing not to continue with her character, professional hit-woman Moore, going forward. Moayed, whose character Corey was originally conceived to be Moore's right-hand man, was quietly dropped as a series regular after the second episode.

Reception

Ratings

Critical receptionBelieve'' has received mixed reviews. On Rotten Tomatoes, the show has an approval rating of 39% based on 38 critics, with an average rating of 5.4/10. On Metacritic, it holds an average score of 55 out of 100 based on 25 critics, indicating "mixed or average reviews".

Broadcast
The series premiered in the UK on the Watch channel on March 27, 2014. It airs in Canada on the CTV network, and in Latin America on the Warner Channel. It premiered in Australia on the Nine Network on April 15, 2015.

References

External links
 
 

2014 American television series debuts
2014 American television series endings
2010s American drama television series
2010s American science fiction television series
English-language television shows
American fantasy drama television series
NBC original programming
Television series by Bad Robot Productions
Television series by Warner Bros. Television Studios
Television shows filmed in New York (state)
Television shows set in New Jersey
Works by Alfonso Cuarón